What Comes After may refer to:
 What Comes After (album), an album by Terje Rypdal
 What Comes After (The Walking Dead), an episode of the television series The Walking Dead
 What Comes After, an album by The Honeydogs